Bubi Is Jealous (German: Bubi ist eifersüchtig) is a 1916 German silent film directed by Hanna Henning and starring Reinhold Schünzel and Olga Engl.

Cast
 Reinhold Schünzel as Hellmut Hartleben
 Olga Engl as Frau von Hartleben 
 Joseph Römer as Bubi 
 Ally Kay as Ally Heldringen 
 Susanne Lafrenz as Lotte

References

Bibliography
 Bock, Hans-Michael & Bergfelder, Tim. The Concise CineGraph. Encyclopedia of German Cinema. Berghahn Books, 2009.

External links

1916 films
Films of the German Empire
German silent feature films
Films directed by Hanna Henning
German black-and-white films
1910s German films